Super League XXIV, known as the Betfred Super League XXIV for sponsorship reasons, was the 2019 iteration of and the 24th season of the Super League and 125th season of rugby league in Great Britain. 

Twelve teams competed over 29 rounds, including the Magic Weekend, which took place at Anfield. After the regular rounds, the top five highest teams entered the Super League play-offs, for a place in the Super League Grand Final. The remaining seven teams were eliminated after the main league stage. 

London Broncos were immediately relegated to the Championship after only being promoted last year, but a bad season saw them win just 10 games out of 29. They will be replaced by Toronto Wolfpack.

Wigan Warriors were the defending champions, but they were eliminated from the competition, after suffering back to back defeats in the semi finals. First against St Helens in the Semi final, and eventually losing out to Salford in the preliminary final.

Toronto Wolfpack won the Million Pound Game by beating Featherstone Rovers 24–6 and were promoted to the Super League, for the first time in the club's history.

St. Helens were crowned champions on 12 October, after a 23–6 victory over Salford, saw them claim their first championship in 5 years, and the first team to claim both the League leaders shield and the grand final since Leeds Rhinos in 2015

Format 

Following a vote of RFL clubs in 2018, Super League has implemented a number of changes to the format for Super League XXIV. The Qualifiers were scrapped and the play-offs for the Super League Grand Final changed from a top four to top five play-offs system for the first time for 18 years as it was last used in 2001. For relegation, the Rugby League Super 8s were also scrapped so that the team that finishes bottom of the Super League will be relegated and replaced by the winner of the Championship Grand Final. The Magic Weekend was held on 25 and 26 May at Anfield in Liverpool. Each team will play each other home and away, with an extra game at the Magic Weekend, before a series of 6 "loop" fixtures are played to finish the regular season. 

The Super League game between Catalans Dragons and Wigan Warriors, saw a new record crowd of 31,555 fans, and it was the first game to be played at Barcelona's Camp Nou stadium on 18 May 2019.

Catalan went on to win the match, 33–16, thus ending a 10-game losing streak against Wigan, and their first win over Wigan since 2015.

For the first time in Super League history, the Derby between St Helens and Wigan was not televised, as Sky Sports opted to televise the relegation battle between Leeds and Hull KR.

St Helens won the League Leaders Shield for the second season running on 3 August when Warrington Wolves were beaten 30-10 by Catalans Dragons, thus ensuring that 2nd placed Warrington, 12 points behind with 5 games left, could no longer catch the Saints.

Teams
Super League XXIV featured twelve teams. This is also the fourth year since promotion and relegation was reintroduced into the competition. London Broncos were promoted from the Championship after defeating Toronto Wolfpack in the final Million Pound Game to compete in Super League for the first time since 2014. They also received special dispensation from the RFL to play their home Super League matches at their Trailfinders Sports Ground, which they share with rugby union's Ealing Trailfinders, even though it is smaller than the RFL's minimum seating requirements. London replaced Widnes Vikings who were relegated last season.

Just prior to the start of the season Wigan Warriors were fined and deducted two competition points for breaching the salary cap in 2017;
 however, on 6 March following an appeal, the points deduction was suspended, and Wigan were reinstated the 2 points, as long as the club do not breach the salary cap in the following 12 months.

Twelve teams were selected to play in the inaugural Super League season.

Results

Golden Point Extra Time 
Golden-point extra-time, shot clocks and a reduced number of interchanges are among the law changes confirmed by Super League for the 2019 season.

On 19 November 2018, it was confirmed that Super League would be adopting golden point during regular season for the first time as of the start of the 2019 season, bringing it in line with the NRL which has been using the system since 2003.  

The 12 clubs announced the introduction of golden-point extra-time in November, with games level at full-time, to be decided in two additional five-minute periods. If it remains level after the extra 10 minutes, the match will end as a draw.

Game 1 (Wigan v Hull FC)
The first game to go to golden-point, was the round 3 game between Wigan and Hull F.C. on 24 February 2019. Hull won 23–22, after the scores were tied at 22-all after 80 minutes.

Game 2 (Leeds v Castleford)
The second game to go to golden-point, was the round 8 game between Leeds and Castleford, on 28 March 2019. Leeds won the match 21–20, after a 40m field goal from Brad Dwyer after the scores were tied at 20-all after 80 minutes.

Game 3 (Catalans v Hull FC)
The third game to go to golden-point, was the round 10 game between Catalans and Hull FC, on 12 April 2019. Hull won the match 31–30, thanks to a Marc Sneyd  field goal, after the scores were tied at 30-all after 80 minutes. 
This is Hull's 2nd golden point victory so far this season, Sneyd has scored the decisive field goal in both.

Game 4 (Castleford v Huddersfield)
The fourth game to go to golden-point, was the round 17 game between Castleford and Huddersfield Giants on 7 June 2019. Castleford won the match 27–26, thanks to a Peter Matautia  field goal, after the scores were tied at 26-all after 80 minutes.

Game 5 (London v St Helens)
The fifth game to go to golden-point, was the round 17 game between London Broncos and St Helens on 9 June 2019. London won the match 23–22, thanks to a Morgan Smith field goal, after the scores were tied at 22-all after 80 minutes.

Game 6 (Hull KR v Castleford)
The sixth game to go to golden-point, was the round 24 game between Hull KR and Castleford on 4 August 2019. Hull KR won the match 27–26, thanks to a Danny McGuire field goal, after the scores were tied at 26-all after 80 minutes. 

This was the 3rd time that Castleford had forced extra time, winning just once

Game 7 (Salford v Hull KR)
The seventh game to go to golden-point, was the round 29 game between Salford and Hull KR on 13 September 2019. Salford won 17–16,  after the scores were tied at 16-all after 80 minutes.

Table

Playoffs
The play-off system in use for 2019 was also previously used between 1998 and 2001.

Week 1: Elimination and qualifying finals

Week 2: Semi-finals

Week 3: Preliminary final

Week 4: Grand final

Player statistics

Top 10 try scorers

Top 10 try assists

Top 10 goal scorers

Top 10 points scorers

Statistics correct, as of 20 September 2019 (Play off game 2)

Discipline

 Red Cards

  Yellow Cards

Statistics correct as of 20 September 2019 (playoffs game 2)

Man of Steel contenders
(The 5 nominations for the man of steel awards were as follows)

Awards are presented for outstanding contributions and efforts to players and clubs in the week leading up to the Super League Grand Final

The format for choosing the winner of the Steve Prescott Man of Steel award would also change Prior to this season. It was voted on by Super League players, but from this season onwards, it will adopt a similar system to the NRL equivalent the Dally M Medal. A 21-man panel of former players  chose the three best players from each weekly round game. 6 points were split between 3 players, with 1st place getting 3 points, 2nd getting 2 points, and 3rd getting 1 point. The leaderboard was public until week 22 in mid-July, when it was then hidden until the Steve Prescott Man of Steel Awards ceremony in October.

Salford's
Jackson Hastings was eventually crowned Man of Steel on 6 October 2019.

End-of-season awards

 Coach of the year:  Justin Holbrook
 Foundation of the year:  Warrington Wolves
 Hit Man:  Danny Houghton (1259 tackles)
 Man of Steel:  Jackson Hastings
 Metre-maker:  Tommy Makinson (3,803 metres)
 Fans' Entertainer: Jackson Hastings (Salford Red Devils)
 Spirit of Super League Award: Jamie Jones-Buchanan (Leeds Rhinos)
 Top Try Scorer:  Tommy Makinson (23)
 Young player of the year:  Matty Lees

Attendances

Average attendances

Top 10 attendances

* As of 12 October 2019

References